The Noelle Nashville Hotel is a historic Art Deco hotel in Nashville, Tennessee, USA. originally opened in 1929 as the Noel Hotel

History
The 12-story Noel Hotel was constructed with steel and concrete. It was completed in 1929. It was designed in the Classical Revival style by the architectural firm Marr and Holman. It was named after the Noel family, who owned the land upon which it was built.

It has been listed on the National Register of Historic Places since October 10, 1984.

The structure served for many years as an office building, known as Noel Place.

It was converted back to a hotel in 2017, with the spelling of the name slightly changed to Noelle.

References

External links
 Noelle Nashville Hotel official website

Hotel buildings on the National Register of Historic Places in Tennessee
Neoclassical architecture in Tennessee
Hotel buildings completed in 1929
Hotels in Nashville, Tennessee
National Register of Historic Places in Nashville, Tennessee